The North Leicestershire League is a football competition based in Leicestershire, England. This league was established in 1931 and was formerly known as the Loughborough and District Amateur Football Alliance. It has a total of four divisions, the highest of which, the Premier Division, is a feeder to the Leicestershire Senior League. Each division has a different sponsor.

Champions

Member clubs 2015–16

East Goscote Plumbers Premier Division
Castle Donington
Falcons
FC Wymeswold
Greenhill Youth Club
Loughborough
Mountsorrel Amateurs
Ravenstone United
Sileby Victoria
Sutton Bonington Academicals
Thringstone Miners Welfare

Shedland.co.uk Division One
Anstey Crown
Ashby Ivanhoe Development
Belton Villa
Bottesford
Genesis
Greenhill Youth Club Reserves
Loughborough Reserves
Loughborough United
Sileby Saints
Sutton Bonington

Sports Advocate Division Two
Birstall Old Boys
Kegworth Imperial
Market Bosworth Town
Measham Imperial
Mountsorrel Amateurs Reserves
Ravenstone United Reserves
Shelthorpe Dynamo Reserves
Shepshed Amateurs
Sileby Victoria Reserves
Woodhouse Imperial

Windmill Trophies Division Three
Birstall Old Boys Reserves
Castle Donington Reserves
FC Coalville
Loughborough 'A'
Loughborough Emmanuel
Loughborough United Reserves
Mountsorrel
Shepborough United
Shepshed Amateurs Reserves
Sporting Markfield
Woodhouse Imperial Reserves

Cups
The league runs two cup competitions, the Cobbin Trophy and the Bonser Trophy. The Cobbin Trophy is open to all first teams, whilst the Bonser Trophy is for reserve and 'A' teams.

Previous winners

External links
Official website

 
1931 establishments in England
Football leagues in England
Sports leagues established in 1931